The bust of Edward Snowden, called Prison Ship Martyrs' Monument 2.0 by its creators, was an ephemeral, illegally installed public sculpture of Edward Snowden, an American whistleblower who leaked classified information from the National Security Agency (NSA) and was charged with federal crimes as a result. The bronze-like bust was placed in Fort Greene Park in Fort Greene, Brooklyn, New York City, on April 6, 2015.  This sparked outrage by the Society of Old Brooklynites    It was attached to a Doric column on the perimeter of the park's Prison Ship Martyrs' Monument, a memorial and crypt which honors and inters the more than 11,500 American prisoners of war who died in the American Revolution while housed on British prison ships.

Affixed atop an existing column, the bust was mounted by three anonymous artists and their helpers, who were dressed in white construction helmets and reflective vests in imitation of Parks Department workers, early in the morning of April 6, then covered and taken down by NYC Parks officials later that day. A hologram tribute to Snowden was subsequently installed after the sculpture was removed.

Development and design
The piece was conceived in 2014 by two artists from New York City and a sculptor from the West Coast. The sculptor volunteered his time and skill in creating the bust, with the piece eventually costing thousands of dollars to create over six months.

The piece was fused to Fort Greene Park's Prison Ship Martyrs' Monument which commemorates American prisoners of war who died aboard British prison ships, in the pre-dawn hours of April 6, 2015. The sculptor recommended that the two artists create a bust after they had suggested a life-size statue of Snowden. The bust was made from Hydrocal, a plaster-like substance resembling bronze in appearance, which was then fixed to the pre-existing column with a non-damaging adhesive. The piece was designed to be similar in style to other sculptures in the park.

While it was very important to the artists that the piece be more than just a prop or papier-mache effigy, they also wished not to damage the surface to which the bust would be bound. After some debate, they decided on an adhesive that would firmly hold the head in place, yet could be removed without marring the monument. The sculpture had Snowden's name at its base, consistent with the names on the bases of other sculptures in the park.

The Guardian newspaper expressed the view that the bust also looked like the former White House press secretary Jay Carney and some people thought it looked more like him than it did Snowden.

Prison Ship Martyrs' Monument 2.0 is one of at least six sculptures and monuments to Snowden that have appeared around the world.  In October 2014, a statue of Snowden appeared in Union Square, Manhattan, near Henry Kirke Brown's statue of Abraham Lincoln. It was shown in conjunction with the Art in Odd Places festival and was sculpted by Jim Dessicino, a Delaware artist.  One of the bust's observers compared Snowden to Daniel Ellsberg, who leaked the Pentagon Papers to The New York Times.

Installation
The creators of the sculpture, who were dubbed "guerrilla artists" by some in the media, released a statement to the Animal New York website detailing their motivations and documenting the bust's installation in exchange for anonymity. In their statement, the artists said:

The artists also expressed their dismay with perceived public apathy at Snowden's revelations.

While anticipating the sculpture's probable demise, the creators told Mashable on April 6, 2015 that they "hope New York will embrace and protect this piece, much as when the Wall Street Bull was granted a permanent public home after its guerrilla placement. Even though it's already on  way towards being removed, the possibility exists for the city to make the piece available for public viewing in a sanctioned way."

The unsanctioned bust had appeared a few hours after HBO's broadcast of John Oliver's Last Week Tonight interview with Snowden in Moscow.

Removal and aftermath

Local residents had varied responses. The sculpture was up for only 12 to 13 hours before it was covered by blue tarpaulin and bound with rope at 12:30 pm on April 6, 2015, almost immediately after an official discovered it, then taken down an hour later. Calling it an "art prank", investigators from the New York City Police Department's Intelligence Division reportedly gathered DNA and examining other evidence in an attempt to determine the identity of the artist or artists. According to a spokesperson for the New York City Department of Parks and Recreation,  "[t]he erection of any unapproved structure or artwork in a city park is illegal." Some passersby were annoyed at the covering of the bust, however.

The bust was being held at the NYPD's 88th Precinct pending the investigation's outcome.

Hours after the sculpture was removed, a group of New York artists calling themselves the Illuminator Art Collective—unrelated to the three artists who created the bust—used smoke and projection equipment to create an ephemeral "hologram" image of Snowden in place of the missing sculpture. This projection included Snowden's face above one of the pillars, as well as "Snowden" in white letters at the bottom of the pillar. Collective artists said, "Our feeling is that while the State may remove any material artifacts that speak in defiance against incumbent authoritarianism, the acts of resistance remain in the public consciousness. And it is in sharing that act of defiance that hope resides." The original artists said they were "touched" to see their bust and nameplate "reinstalled" with the use of light, adding that they were "surprised to see the way the statue was covered up before its removal, as though it were a profane statement."

New York City has had a number of pieces of street art, like the Charging Bull, which have become cultural icons and tourist attractions. An online petition sought the return of the bust to the Prison Ship Martyrs' Monument.

The New York Daily News reported on April 14, 2015, that Ron Kuby, a lawyer representing the unidentified artists, had asked New York City Police Commissioner Bill Bratton to return the sculpture to its creators. Kuby stated, "The statue itself is not contraband. Whatever the right of the Parks Department to remove an unauthorized sculpture, that does not translate into the right of the police to indefinitely detain a work of art." The artists planned to submit an application for authorized public display, and a Manhattan art gallery also expressed interest in exhibiting the Snowden sculpture.

Return of sculpture

After negotiations with the artists' attorney, the city returned the sculpture on May 6, 2015, assessing each artist a $50 fine for non-criminal trespassing due to their having illegally entered Fort Greene Park at night. Ron Kuby promised his clients' fines would be "promptly paid", and expressed gratitude that potential removal and storage fees for the sculpture were waived. A police summons identified the artists as Andrew Tider and Jeff Greenspan.

The undamaged bust had its first post-police custody exhibition from May 8–17 at The Boiler in Brooklyn, in a show titled anonymity, no longer an option. The artists were reportedly applying to have the sculpture legally exhibited by New York City through the city's "Art in the Parks" program: "This time they're dotting their i's and crossing their t's", Kuby said.

It was thereafter exhibited at the Brooklyn Museum.

Notes

References

External links
 
 
 3D model of the statue and column on Sketchfab
 3D model of the Snowden bust on Sketchfab
 Interview with Jeff Greenspan about the Edward Snowden statue on Webydo

2015 in New York City
2015 politics in New York (state)
Edward Snowden
Anonymous works
Busts in New York City
Collection of the Brooklyn Museum
Cultural depictions of Edward Snowden
Culture jamming
Fort Greene, Brooklyn
Guerilla art and hacking art
Edward Snowden
Sculptures of men in New York City